Frederick Ogden or similar may refer to:

Frederick Ogden (politician), British politician
Frederick B. Ogden, American politician
Frederick Nash Ogden, Confederate soldier and American white supremacist